Odontarrhena chondrogyna is a species of perennial flowering plants in the family Brassicaceae. It was previously included in the genus Alyssum, and hence named Alyssum chondrogynum, but was assigned to the newly established Odontarrhena after molecular phylogeny studies from the 2010s. It is endemic to the island of Cyprus, where it grows on rocky serpentinised slopes.

Description 

The plant is a much branched subshrub with suberect, woody-at-base, stems, 20–50 cm high. Leaves alternate, simple, entire, grey-green, thick, obovoid to suborbicular, 8-16 x 7–13 mm, with short stellate hairs. Flowers actinomorphic, in terminal corymbose inflorescences, golden yellow, with  4 petals and sepals. Flowers April–June. Fruit an obovoid silicle with short stellate hairs.

Distribution
It is only found in the Limassol Forest of Cyprus at 200–700 m altitudes where it is locally common: Kakomallis, Eloros, Kyparishia, Yerasa, Kellaki, Sanidha and Listovounos Forest.

References

External links

 https://www.biolib.cz/en/image/id47448/
 http://www.theplantlist.org/tpl1.1/record/kew-2632006
 http://kiki.huh.harvard.edu/databases/specimen_search.php?mode=details&id=60325
 http://ww2.bgbm.org/EuroPlusMed/PTaxonDetail.asp?NameId=79935&PTRefFk=7200000

Brassicaceae
Endemic flora of Cyprus